Caterpillar Twenty-Two is a tractor that was first manufactured by Caterpillar in 1934 to replace the Caterpillar Twenty.

References

Caterpillar Inc. vehicles
Tractors